DeMastro Vineyards is a winery in the Vincentown section of Southampton in Burlington County, New Jersey. DeMastro has 31 acres of grapes under cultivation, and produces 7,000 cases of wine per year. The winery was incorporated in 1990. The winery's name is an amalgamation of the owners' surnames.

Wines
DeMastro Vineyards is in the Outer Coastal Plain AVA, and produces wine from Barbera, Cabernet Sauvignon, Chardonnay, Merlot, Pinot noir, and Riesling grapes.

Licensing, associations, and distribution
DeMastro has a farm winery license from the New Jersey Division of Alcoholic Beverage Control, which allows it to produce up to 50,000 gallons of wine per year, operate up to 15 off-premises sales rooms, and ship up to 12 cases per year to consumers in-state or out-of-state. The winery is not a member of the Garden State Wine Growers Association or the Outer Coastal Plain Vineyard Association. DeMastro sells their wines on-site, at local restaurants, and though online sales.

See also 
Alcohol laws of New Jersey
American wine
Judgment of Princeton
List of wineries, breweries, and distilleries in New Jersey
New Jersey Farm Winery Act
New Jersey Wine Industry Advisory Council
New Jersey wine

References 

Wineries in New Jersey
Southampton Township, New Jersey
Tourist attractions in Burlington County, New Jersey